West Kingston may refer to:

 West Kingston, England, hamlet in West Sussex
 West Kingston, Rhode Island, in the United States
 West Kingston, Jamaica, section of Kingston, Jamaica